In geometry, Hironaka's example is a non-Kähler complex manifold that is a deformation of Kähler manifolds found by . Hironaka's example can be used to show that several other plausible statements holding for smooth varieties of dimension at most 2 fail for smooth varieties of dimension at least 3.

Hironaka's example

Take two smooth curves C and D in a smooth projective 3-fold P, intersecting in two points c and d that are nodes for the reducible curve . For some applications these should be chosen so that there is a fixed-point-free automorphism exchanging the curves C and D and also exchanging the points c and d.

A complete  abstract variety that is not projective

Hironaka's variety is a smooth 3-dimensional complete variety but is not projective as it has a non-trivial curve algebraically equivalent to 0. Any 2-dimensional smooth complete variety is projective, so 3 is the smallest possible dimension for such an example. There are plenty of 2-dimensional complex manifolds that are not algebraic, such as Hopf surfaces (non Kähler) and non-algebraic tori (Kähler).

An effective cycle algebraically equivalent to 0

In a projective variety, a nonzero effective cycle has non-zero degree so cannot be algebraically equivalent to 0. In Hironaka's example the effective cycle consisting of the two exceptional curves is algebraically equivalent to 0.

A deformation of Kähler manifolds that is not a Kähler manifold

If one of the curves D in Hironaka's construction is allowed to vary in a family such that most curves of the family do not intersect D, then one obtains a family of manifolds such that most are projective but one is not. Over the complex numbers this gives a deformation of smooth Kähler (in fact projective) varieties that is not Kähler. This family is trivial in the smooth category, so in particular there are Kähler and non-Kähler smooth compact 3-dimensional complex manifolds that are diffeomorphic.

A smooth algebraic space that is not a scheme

Choose C and D so that P has an automorphism σ of order 2 acting freely on P and exchanging C and D, and also exchanging c and d. Then the quotient of V by the action of σ is a smooth 3-dimensional algebraic space with an irreducible curve algebraically equivalent to 0. This means that the quotient is a smooth 3-dimensional algebraic space that is not a scheme.

A Moishezon manifold that is not an abstract variety

If the previous construction is done with complex manifolds rather than algebraic spaces, it gives an example of a smooth 3-dimensional compact Moishezon manifold that is not an abstract variety. A Moishezon manifold of dimension at most 2 is necessarily projective, so 3 is the minimum possible dimension for this example.

The quotient of a scheme by a free action of a finite group need not be a scheme

This is essentially the same as the previous two examples. The quotient does exist as a scheme if every orbit is contained in an affine open subscheme; the counterexample above shows that this technical condition cannot be dropped.

A finite subset of a variety need not be contained in an open affine subvariety

For quasi-projective varieties, it is obvious that any finite subset is contained in an open affine subvariety. This property fails for Hironaka's example: a two-points set consisting of a point in each of the exceptional curves is not contained in any open affine subvariety.

A variety with no Hilbert scheme

For Hironaka's variety V over the complex numbers with an automorphism of order 2 as above, the Hilbert functor HilbV/C of closed subschemes is not representable by a scheme, essentially because the quotient by the group of order 2 does not exist as a scheme . In other words, this gives an example of a smooth complete variety whose Hilbert scheme does not exist. Grothendieck showed that the Hilbert scheme always exists for projective varieties.

Descent can fail for proper smooth morphisms of proper schemes

Pick a non-trivial Z/2Z torsor B → A; for example in characteristic not 2 one could take A and B to be the affine line minus the origin with the map from B to A given by x → x2. Think of B as an open covering of U for the étale topology. If V is a complete scheme with a fixed point free action of a group of order 2, then descent data for the map V × B → B are given by a suitable isomorphism from V×C to itself, where C = B×AB = B × Z/2Z. Such an isomorphism is given by the action of Z/2Z on V and C. If this descent datum were effective then the fibers of the descent over U would give a quotient of V by the action of Z/2Z. So if this quotient does not exist as a scheme (as in the example above) then the descent data are ineffective. See .

A scheme of finite type over a field such that not every line bundle comes from a divisor

If X is a scheme of finite type over a field there is a natural map from divisors to line bundles. If X is either projective or reduced then this map is surjective. Kleiman found an example of a non-reduced  and non-projective X for which this map is not surjective as follows. Take Hironaka's example of a variety with two rational curves A and B such that A+B is numerically equivalent to 0. Then X is given by picking points a and b on A and B and introducing nilpotent elements at these points.

References

External links

Algebraic geometry